The Suzuki Fronx is a subcompact crossover SUV (B-segment) produced by the Japanese manufacturer Suzuki in India since 2023. It is based on the Baleno hatchback, and positioned below the Brezza.

Presented in January 2023 at the Auto Expo, the Fronx is exclusively available at the Nexa dealership chain reserved for high-end Maruti Suzuki models. It is Suzuki's second model in the sub-4 metre SUV segment in India, and occupies the lower bracket of India's sub-4 metre tax structure due to its smaller engine. The Fronx is scheduled to be exported to markets including Australia, Africa, Latin America and the Middle East.

References

External links 

 

Fronx
Cars introduced in 2023
Mini sport utility vehicles
Crossover sport utility vehicles
Front-wheel-drive vehicles